Beware the Book of Eli (stylized in all caps) is the third mixtape by American rapper Ski Mask the Slump God. It was officially released on May 11, 2018, by Victor Victor Worldwide and Republic Records, after it was originally released on May 1, 2018 on SoundCloud, but was quickly taken down by his management at the time.

Recording sessions took place from 2017 to 2018, which features production from Murda Beatz, Timbaland, Jimmy Duval and Natra Average, among others. The album features guest appearances from Rich the Kid, Ronny J, Danny Towers and SahBabii.

Track listing
Credits adapted from Tidal.

Notes
 All tracks are stylized in all caps, except "DoIHaveTheSause?". For example, "Suicide Season" is stylized as "SUICIDE SEASON".
 "DoIHaveTheSause?" was titled "The Bees Knees" in the original release.
"Child's Play" was titled "Poltergeist" in the original release.
 "SkiMeetsWorld", "With Vengeance", and "Worldwide" were removed from the final track list.

Charts

References

2018 mixtape albums
Ski Mask the Slump God albums
Albums produced by Cubeatz
Albums produced by Murda Beatz
Albums produced by Timbaland
Republic Records albums